Julie Mayaya Nzal A Nka (born 17 February 1986 in Iași) is a Romanian singer. She took part in the second season of Pro TV's The Voice and was crowned the winner on 26 December 2012, becoming the first female contestant to win. Julie is of Congolese descent through her father.

Since her part in The Voice, she started a new project and started participating in the 12th season of the TV Show "Te cunosc de undeva". Julie said "I'm sure that this experience will test my limits and from witch I will learn a lot. It scares me the fact that I will have to use contact lenses. That because I have never used, and I know that my eyes are sensitive. It also scares me because i have to give up my long daring nails, and I know that my Afro hair will be a real challenge for the stylists"

Julie was also chosen by Disney to dub a muse in the animated movie Hercules, and to sing the opening theme in Romanian from the well-known movie The Lion King in 2019.

Performances on The Voice of Romania
Mayayas performed the following songs on The Voice of Romania:

Her debut single, "Stay", entered at number No. 75 on the Romanian Top 100.

References

External links 
 Personal Website

1986 births
Musicians from Iași
Romanian people of Democratic Republic of the Congo descent
Living people
The Voice (franchise) winners
21st-century Romanian singers
21st-century Romanian women singers